The Huizhou Pumped Storage Power Station is a pumped storage hydroelectric power station near Huizhou in Guangdong province, China. It contains 8 pump-generators that total a  installed capacity. Initial units went online between 2007 and 2008, and the power station was complete on June 15, 2011.

The power station is supplied with water by an upper reservoir which is created by two dams. Once water from the upper reservoir is transferred through the power station, which is located  underground, and electricity produced, it discharges to a lower reservoir. The water can then be pumped by the generators back into the upper reservoir for reuse.

See also 

 Guangdong Pumped Storage Power Station
 List of power stations in China

References 

Dams completed in 2007
Energy infrastructure completed in 2011
Hydroelectric power stations in Guangdong
Pumped-storage hydroelectric power stations in China
Roller-compacted concrete dams
Dams in China
2011 establishments in China